Maiden Spring is a historic home and farm complex and national historic district located at Pounding Mill, Tazewell County, Virginia. The district encompasses eight contributing buildings, two contributing sites, and one contributing structure. The main house consists of a large two-story, five-bay, frame, central-passage-plan dwelling with an earlier frame dwelling (c. 1772), incorporated as an ell. Also on the property are the contributing meat house, slave house, summer kitchen, horse barn, the stock barn, the hen house, the granary / corn crib, the source of Maiden Spring, the cemetery, and the schoolhouse.  It was the home of 19th-century congressman, magistrate and judge Rees Bowen (1809–1879) and his son, Henry (1841-1915), also a congressman.  During the American Civil War, Confederate Army troops camped on the Maiden Spring Farm.

It was listed on the National Register of Historic Places in 1994.

References

Houses on the National Register of Historic Places in Virginia
Farms on the National Register of Historic Places in Virginia
Historic districts on the National Register of Historic Places in Virginia
Houses completed in 1838
Houses in Tazewell County, Virginia
National Register of Historic Places in Tazewell County, Virginia